Mount Pisgah is a hill in Lane County, Oregon, United States, rising  above the surrounding Willamette Valley to a maximum elevation of . It was named after the biblical Mount Pisgah. It is situated between the Coast Fork and Middle Fork of the Willamette River, two miles (3 km) southeast of their confluence. Springfield is immediately north of Mount Pisgah, and the city of Eugene is a few miles west. It is the site of the 2363-acre (956 hectare) Howard Buford Recreation Area as well as the non-profit Mount Pisgah Arboretum at its base.

Recreation

Several hiking trails are maintained by the Lane County Parks Department on Mount Pisgah. The summit is accessible by a steep  trail from a parking area near the base of the hill. Several other trails make their way through the adjacent arboretum and up the slopes.

The summit offers a panoramic view of the southern Willamette Valley and includes a bronze relief sculpture (a memorial for Ken Kesey's son Jed) illustrating the surrounding topography and identifying many nearby geographic features.

Arboretum
As of May 2020, admission is $5 per car and permits can be purchased at a self-service pay station, card only.

Geology
The hill consists of basalt or its intrusive equivalent diabase. Small crystals of calcite and various zeolite minerals are often seen where the rock outcrops, especially near the summit. Specific minerals found in the area include agate, calcite, heulandite, jasper, malachite, mesolite, and quartz

Controversy

Wildish Land Company owns  of undisturbed land adjacent to the park and has filed an Oregon Measure 37 claim.  The claim seeks either compensation of $15 million for diminution in land value caused by state and county land use regulations enacted since Wildish acquired the property, or in the alternative, a waiver of offending land use regulations enacted since its acquisition.  The land is zoned for gravel production with an estimated value, under current zoning, at around $5 million. As an alternative to development or compensation, some have suggested the controversy represents a historic opportunity to purchase the land, integrate it with the existing park, and eventually link the expanded Howard Buford Recreation Area with other undeveloped land as part of a greater Eugene greenway.

On December 6, 2006, Lane County approved Wildish's Measure 37 claim, waiving non-exempt offending regulations enacted since Wildish acquired the property.  The Oregon Department of Administrative Services has not yet ruled on Wildish's state application.  Before any development may happen, Wildish must still receive a waiver from the state, and it must still submit a development application to the county.

References

External links

Lane County government article about the location
mindat.org, the mineral and locality database
USGS 1:24000 Topographic Maps
Lane County government article about parking violation fees
Lane County government article about park user fees
Essay at the Friends of Buford Park & Mt. Pisgah
Opinion in Eugene Register-Guard
 Friends of Buford Park & Mount Pisgah
 Mt. Pisgah Arboretum

Landmarks in Oregon
Hills of Oregon
Landforms of Lane County, Oregon